Venchi is an Italian gourmet chocolate manufacturer founded by chocolatier Silviano Venchi. After its establishment in Turin in early 1878, the company expanded throughout Italy with its Nougatine, small candies made of crushed and caramelized hazelnuts coated in dark chocolate.

For the production of its various chocolates, Venchi uses cocoa originating from plantations in Central America, South America, and Africa along with distilled rum from the Caribbean and natural vanilla. The Piedmontese hazelnuts are claimed to prevent the chocolate from tasting acidic.

The company started to make ice cream in 2006, and it operates approximately 120 shops in more than 70 countries.

Awards
In October 2004, Venchi's Chocaviar was awarded the Vassoio d'Oro Award at the EuroChocolate festival in Perugia.

See also
 List of bean-to-bar chocolate manufacturers

References

External links
Official website

Companies based in Piedmont
Food and drink companies established in 1878
Italian chocolate companies
Italian brands